Plantar digital arteries may refer to:

 Common plantar digital arteries
 Proper plantar digital arteries